Richard Stockton Forrest (May 8, 1932 – March 14, 2005) was an American mystery and suspense novelist and short story author.

Biography 
Forrest was born in Upper Montclair, New Jersey. Although his family moved frequently, he spent most of his childhood living in New Jersey, graduating from Ridgewood High School in 1950. He studied in the New York Dramatic Workshop in 1950 under the German director Erwin Piscator. He enlisted in the U.S. Army in 1951 and served in various locations in the United States. He was discharged in 1954. While writing plays and novels at night, he worked in the title insurance industry from 1958 to 1972. In 1972, Forrest left his position to write novels and short stories. His first novel, Who Killed Mr. Garland's Mistress, was published in 1974 and was nominated for an Edgar Award. His books and short stories were published in the U.S., U.K., Japan, Italy, Finland, France, Germany, and Sweden. The Richard Forrest collection, which includes published and unpublished manuscripts, correspondence, personal memorabilia, printed materials, research materials, legal materials, and financial materials is stored in the Howard Gotlieb Archival Research Center at Boston University.

Forrest died of chronic obstructive pulmonary disease due to smoking in 2005.

Books

Lyon and Bea Wentworth Mystery Series 
The Lyon and Bea Wentworth Mystery Series comprises 10 novels set in a small town called Murphysville, Connecticut. Lyon Wentworth and his wife, Bea Wentworth, a state senator, team up with Police Chief Rocco Herbert, Lyon's wartime buddy, to unravel a variety of murder mysteries. Lyon writes children's books and is a hot air balloonist. The New York Times Book Review called the first book in the series, A Child's Garden of Death, "a curiously absorbing book, and a compassionate one."

* A Child's Garden of Death (1975) - Two adults and a young girl clutching a doll are found in a 30-year old grave.
 The Wizard of Death (1977) - A gubernatorial candidate that Bea introduces at a rally is shot, but she soon learns that she is also a target.
 Death Through the Looking Glass (1978) - Lyon spots his best friend's airplane crash while he is hot air ballooning over long island sound, but there is no sign of the wreckage.   
 The Death in the Willows (1979) - Lyon is aboard a bus that is hijacked and stopped in the middle of the Lincoln Tunnel.
  The Death at Yew Corner (1980) - Bea visits her college philosophy professor at a convalescent home, and discovers that she has been murdered.
  Death Under the Lilacs (1985) - Bea is kidnapped and left to die, and Lyon must race to save her. 
  Death on the Mississippi (1989) - Lyon's old army buddy and his houseboat filled with cash disappear.
  The Piped Piper of Death (1997) - Bea and Lyon attend a party where a historian-in-residence turns up murdered.
  Death in the Secret Garden (2004) - A woman is found murdered in the woods, and a retired and mentally unstable Vietnam Veteran, the "Spook," is (falsely) accused.
  Death at King Arthur's Court (2005), published posthumously - Lyon wakes up from what he thinks is a dream in which he is pursued by a hooded monk wielding a medieval sword. But the dream turns to nightmare when he realizes his clothes are torn and bloodstained.

Sign Mystery Series with Diff James 
Forrest wrote three novels for youth and low fluency adults as part of "The Thumbprint Mysteries" series. Each of these books features Diff James, a mute woodsman with an uncanny ability to understand animals.
 Sign of the Beast (1998) - Old man Hardy was found dead inside his locked cabin. Was he killed by a bear or a human?
 Sign of Blood (1998) - Diff sees a plane crash into a lake. Two days later the pilot was found in his plane with a gunshot to his head.
 Sign of Terror (1999) - Diff is arrested for the murder of an actress and must prove his innocence.

Non-Series Books 
 Who Killed Mr. Garland's Mistress (1974)
 The Killing Edge (1980)
 Lark (1986)
 Nursing Homes: The Complete Guide (1990)
 Retirement Living: A Guide to Housing Alternatives (1991)
 The Disappearing Airplane (1996-1997) - Published as a 21-part serial novel in Asahi Weekly
 Murder in the Big Apple (1999) - Published as a 20-part serial novel in Asahi Weekly
 The Impossible Crime (2002) - Published as a 25-part serial novel in Asahi Weekly

Non-Series Books Published Under Pseudonym Stockton Woods 
 The Laughing Man (1980)
 Game Bet (1981)
 The Man Who Heard Too Much (1983)

Short stories

Fiction 
 "Bellamy Thurgood Learns to Skate" (January 1983) - Northeast Magazine, The Hartford Courant
 "Family Friends" (February 1983) - Northeast Magazine, The Hartford Courant
 "Sailors" (July 1983) - Northeast Magazine, The Hartford Courant
 "The Crooked Tree" (December 1983) - Northeast Magazine, The Hartford Courant
 "Crossing the Moat" (1993) St. Raphael's Better Health Writing Contest Winner

Mystery 
 "Mark of the Beast" (1976) - Mystery Monthly
 "Return of the Beast" (1976) - Mystery Monthly
 "The Headmaster Helps One of His Boys" (1982) - Ellery Queen Mystery Magazine
 "A Very Small Rasher" (1994) - Ellery Queen Mystery Magazine
 "Lazy Man" (1998) - Ellery Queen Mystery Magazine

References 

1932 births
2005 deaths
20th-century American novelists
21st-century American novelists
American male novelists
American male short story writers
American mystery novelists
People from Montclair, New Jersey
Ridgewood High School (New Jersey) alumni
20th-century American short story writers
21st-century American short story writers
20th-century American male writers
21st-century American male writers